A 1-up, or extra life, is a video game item.

1-UP, 1UP, 1Up, or one-up may also refer to:
1Up.com, a defunct video game website
1UP!, a 2009 album by illScarlett
1UP (T-Pain album), a 2019 album by T-Pain
1-Up Studio, a Japanese video game studio formerly known as Brownie Brown
One-upmanship, successively outdoing a competitor